Romário da Silva Santos, known as just Romário, is a Brazilian footballer who plays as a right back for Vitória das Tabocas.

References

External links
 

1993 births
Living people
Brazilian footballers
Association football defenders
Esporte Clube Vitória players
Londrina Esporte Clube players
Campeonato Brasileiro Série B players
Sportspeople from Salvador, Bahia